Craugastor sartori, also known as the Chiapas dwarf robber frog, is a species of frog in the family Craugastoridae. It is endemic to Mexico and known from the Sierra Madre de Chiapas in the vicinity of Cerro Ovando, at elevations of about  asl. Its natural habitats are montane cloud and mixed forests. It is threatened by habitat loss caused by particularly logging.

References

montanus
Endemic amphibians of Mexico
Amphibians described in 1965
Taxa named by John Douglas Lynch
Taxonomy articles created by Polbot
Sierra Madre de Chiapas